Muhammād Al-Hasān bin Al-Diddū Al-Shanqītī born 31 October 1963 in Boutilimit, is a Mauritanian Muslim scholar, author, writer, and poet.  He is the President of O'lama Information center, and the President of Abdallah ibn Yasin University. He is also head of the country's Center for the Development of Scholars. In 2014 he was the Vice President of the International Union of Muslim Scholars, and he still member of it.

Early life and studies 
He was raised in an academic family. His grandfather was Muhammad Ali bin Abd-Alwadud, who was a Muslim scholar and his first tutor. He stayed close to him until his death in 1982.

He started studying and memorize the Quran when he was 5 years old with his parents, and finished the memorization of the whole Quran before he reach 10 years old, he studied the Ten qira'at of Quran with his mom, then he learned the Hadith.

Hadith studies 
He has licenses in Hadith from various Islamic scholars in different countries, authorizing him to teach Sahih al-Bukhari, Sahih Muslim, Sunan ibn Majah, Sunan Abu Dawood, Sunan al-Tirmidhi, Al-Sunan al-Sughra, Muwatta Imam Malik and Al-Mustadrak alaa al-Sahihain, and the Musnad Ahmad ibn Hanbal, Sunan al-Darimi, As-Sunan al-Kubra and Sunan al-Daraqutni.

Bibliography 
His books include::
 Addresses to the judges in the Islamic Fiqh. (مخاطبات القضاة فى الفقه الإسلامي).
 The fundamentals of Islamic brotherhood.  (مقومات الأخوة الإسلامية).
 Hajj scenes and their impact on increasing Faith. (مشاهد الحج وأثرها في زيادة الإيمان).
 Love of the Prophet, Peace and Blessings Be Upon Him. (محبة النبي صلى الله عليه وسلم).
 Fiqh al-Khilāf (فقه الخلاف).
 Explanation of the pages of Imam al-Haramain in the Usūl. ( شرح ورقات إمام الحرمين في الأصول).
 The Day of Resurrection sights and judgment. (اليوم الآخر مشاهد وحكم ).
 Shari'a Evidences; Types, features, and symptoms.  (الأدلة الشرعية؛ أنواعها وسماتها وعوارضها).
 Significance ranks in the Usūl, ( مراتب الدلالة في الأصول).
 Rulings of peace in Fiqh. (أحكام السلم في الفقه).

See also 

 Islam in Mauritania
 Yusuf al-Qaradawi
 Salman al-Ouda
 Mohammed Rateb al-Nabulsi
 Tareq Al-Suwaidan
 Omar Abd al-Kafi

References

External links 
 
 
 Official Youtube page
 His books at Noor-book

Living people
21st-century imams
1963 births
20th-century imams
Imam Muhammad ibn Saud Islamic University alumni
Mauritanian writers
International Union of Muslim Scholars members
Mauritanian Sunni Muslim scholars of Islam
Mauritanian Islamists